The 2007–08 season was Morecambe's 84th season since formation, and their first ever in the Football League, having won promotion from the Conference the previous season. They played in League Two, the fourth tier of English football.

Their league campaign can roughly be broken down into three periods of mixed form, excellent form and poor form. After a mixed start, they went on a run of eight wins in 10 games, before recording just two wins in their final 14 games. An 11th placed finish in front of good crowds at Christie Park was a solid start to life in the Football League.

In the cup competitions, they excelled themselves. Although they were eliminated from the FA Cup in the First Round, in the other two competitions they recorded their – as of 2021 – best ever performances.

In the League Cup they reached the Third Round, being drawn away to Championship opposition on each occasion. They stunned Preston North End and Wolverhampton Wanderers (after extra time), before losing 5–0 to Sheffield United.

Meanwhile in the League Trophy, four victories saw them through to the Northern Area Final. A two legged affair against Grimsby Town stood between them and a second Wembley final in as many seasons. However after losing the first leg 1–0 at home, they were unable to turn the tie around at Blundell Park (0–0), and Grimsby progressed.

Competitions

League Two

League table

Results summary

Results by matchday

FA Cup

League Cup

First-team squad
Squad at end of season

Left club during season

References

Notes

2007-08
2007–08 Football League Two by team